The cent is a monetary unit of many national currencies that equals  of the basic monetary unit.
 
Etymologically, the word cent derives from the Latin  meaning 'hundred'.

The cent sign is commonly a simple minuscule (lower case) letter . In North America, the c is crossed by a diagonal stroke or a vertical line (depending on typeface), yielding the character .

The United States one cent coin is generally known by the nickname "penny", alluding to the British coin and unit of that name. Australia ended production of their 1¢ coin in 1992, as did Canada in 2012. Some Eurozone countries ended production of the 1 euro cent coin, most recently Italy in 2018.

Symbol

The cent may be represented by the cent sign, written in various ways according to the national convention and font choice. Most commonly seen forms are a minuscule letter c crossed by a diagonal stroke or a vertical line or by a simple c, depending on the currency (see below). Cent amounts from 1 to 99 can be represented as one or two digits followed by the appropriate abbreviation (2¢, 5c, 75¢, 99c), or as a subdivision of the base unit ($0.75, €0.99) In some countries, longer abbreviations like "ct." are used. Languages that use other alphabets have their own abbreviations and conventions.

The use of the cent symbol has largely fallen into disuse since the mid-20th century as inflation has resulted in very few things being priced in cents in any currency. It was included on US typewriter keyboards, but has not been adopted on computers.

North American cent sign
The cent sign appeared as the shift of the 6 key on American manual typewriters, but that position has been taken over by the freestanding circumflex on computer keyboards. The character (offset 162) can still be created in most common code pages, including Unicode and Windows-1252:
See  for techniques involving the hexadecimal code point  that can be used when there is no numeric keypad, as on many laptops. For the US International keyboard  can be typed.

Orthography
When written in English and Mexican Spanish, the cent sign (¢ or c) follows the amount (with no space between)for example, 2¢ and $0.02, or 2c and €0.02. Conventions in other languages may vary.

Usage

Minor currency units called cent or similar names
Examples of currencies around the world featuring centesimal units called cent, or related words from the same root such as céntimo, centésimo, centavo or sen, are:

 Argentine peso (as centavo)
 Aruban florin, but all circulating coins are in multiples of 5 cents.
 Australian dollar, but all circulating coins are in multiples of 5 cents.
 Barbadian dollar
 Bahamian dollar, but all circulating coins are in multiples of 5 cents.
 Belize dollar
 Bermudian dollar
 Bolivian boliviano (as centavo), but all circulating coins are in multiples of 10 centavos
 Brazilian real (as centavo)
 Brunei dollar (as sen)
 Canadian dollar
 Cayman Islands dollar
 Chilean peso (as centavo). Centavos officially exist and are considered in financial transactions, but there are no current centavo-denominated coins.
 Colombian peso (as centavo)
 Cook Islands dollar (cent, although some 50 cent coins are marked "50 tene")
 Cuban peso (as centavo)
 East Caribbean dollar, but all circulating coins are in multiples of 5 cents.
 Eritrean nakfa
 Estonian kroon (as sent)
 Euro – the coins bear the text "Euro cent". Greek coins have ΛΕΠΤΟ ("lepto") on the obverse of the one-cent coin and ΛΕΠΤΑ ("lepta") on the obverse of the others. The actual usage varies depending on the language.
 Fijian dollar
 Guyanese dollar
 Hong Kong dollar, but all circulating coins are in multiples of 10 cents.
 Indonesian rupiah (as sen)
 Jamaican dollar, but there are no circulating coins with a value below one dollar.
 Kenyan shilling
 Lesotho loti (as sente)
 Liberian dollar
 Lithuanian litas (as centas)
 Macanese pataca (as avo), but all circulating coins are in multiples of 10 avos.
 Malaysian ringgit (as sen), but all circulating coins are in multiples of 5 sen.
 Mauritian rupee
 Mexican peso (as centavo)
 Moroccan dirham (as santim)
 Namibian dollar
 Netherlands Antillean gulden
 New Zealand dollar, but all circulating coins are in multiples of 10 cents.
 Panamanian balboa (as centésimo)
 Peruvian sol (as céntimo)
 Philippine peso (as sentimo or centavo)
 Seychellois rupee
 Sierra Leonean leone
 Singapore dollar, but all circulating coins are in multiples of 5 cents.
 South African rand, but all circulating coins are in multiples of 10 cents.
 Sri Lankan rupee
 Surinamese dollar
 Swazi lilangeni
 New Taiwan dollar, but all circulating coins are in multiples of 50 cents.
 Tanzanian shilling
 Tongan paʻanga (as seniti)
 Trinidad and Tobago dollar
 United States dollar
 Uruguayan peso (as centésimo)
 Zimbabwean dollar

Minor currency units with other names
Examples of currencies featuring centesimal units not called cent

Obsolete centesimal currency units
Examples of currencies which formerly featured centesimal units but now have no fractional denomination in circulation:

Examples of currencies which use the cent symbol for other purposes:
 Costa Rican colón – The common symbol '¢' is frequently used locally to represent '₡', the proper colón designation
 Ghanaian cedi – The common symbol '¢' is sometimes used to represent '₵', the proper cedi designation

See also

Cent (music)

Notes

 
Denominations (currency)
Currency symbols